Shaun Russell (born July 18, 1993) is an American soccer player who plays for AC Syracuse Pulse in the National Independent Soccer Association.

Career 
Russell played college soccer at Saint Francis University between 2011 and 2014.

Russell spent time in the National Premier Soccer League with Virginia Beach City FC and New York Cosmos B.

Russell signed with Richmond Kickers of the United Soccer League on September 14, 2018. Russell made just one league appearance for the club, which came on September 26, 2018 in a 4-1 home defeat to FC Cincinnati.

Russell signed with Forward Madison FC of USL League One on March 25, 2019. He made his competitive debut for the club on April 13, 2019 in a 1-0 away defeat to North Texas SC. On April 19, 2019, Russell scored a 70th minute winner as Madison secured their first ever USL League One victory against Orlando City B.

References

External links 
 
 Profile at SFU Athletics
 NISA profile

1993 births
Living people
American soccer players
Saint Francis Red Flash men's soccer players
Virginia Beach City FC players
New York Cosmos B players
Richmond Kickers players
Forward Madison FC players
Soccer players from Virginia
USL Championship players
Association football defenders
Sportspeople from Chesapeake, Virginia
USL League One players
National Independent Soccer Association players